Vulcanus is Fear My Thoughts' fifth album, released in 2007.

Track listing
"Accompanied By Death" – 3:52
"Blankness" – 3:46
"Culture of Fear" – 6:43
"Accelerate or Die" – 4:11
"Stamp of Credence" – 5:57
"Survival Scars" – 4:17
"Vulcanus" – 5:13
"Soul Consumer" – 4:17
"Both Blood" – 4:05
"Gates to Nowhere" – 4:48
"Lost in Black" – 4:43
"Wasteland" – 5:04

2007 albums
Fear My Thoughts albums
Albums produced by Jacob Hansen